Sreebhumi FC is an Indian professional football club based in the city of Kolkata. The club plays in the Calcutta Football League, the fourth tier of Indian football and top tier of West Bengal state football. Their women's team participated in Indian Women's League, and currently participates in the Calcutta Women's Football League.

Women's team

Current squad

Honours

Women's team

 Calcutta Women's Football League
 Runners-up (2): 2019, 2022–23

References

External links
 CFL clubs at IFA (archived)
 Sreebhumi Football Club at AIFF

Football clubs in Kolkata
Indian Women's League clubs
Women's football clubs in India
Organizations with year of establishment missing